Luigi Perenni, before 1934 Prenn, (born Alois Prenn, 6 June 1913 – 28 August 1943) was an Italian military officer and skier.

Perenni, son of Vincenzo Prenn, was born in Kiens and grew up in Innichen. As a soldier of the Italian Army he placed 3rd in the 18 km cross-country skiing event of the Italian mastership of 1933. In 1934 he was transferred to the new founded mountain warfare school of the Italian Army called Scuola Militare di Alpinismo (today: Centro Addestramento Alpino).

In the rank of a Sergente he was with Enrico Silvestri, Stefano Sertorelli and Sisto Scilligo member of the military patrol team, which won the gold medal at the 1936 Winter Olympics.

At the relay event of the Sport invernali Mondiali he finished 3rd together with Achille Compagnoni, Maurizio Celeste and Giovani Fantoni.

When he died in Cervinia in a mountaineering accident during a military exercise, he had the rank of a Tenente.
The "Luigi Perenni" barracks in Courmayeur are named in his honor. His brother Giovanni was also a successful skier.

Further notable results were:
 1933: 3rd, Italian men's championships of cross-country skiing, 18 km
 1940: 2nd, Italian men's championships of cross-country skiing, 36 km

References 

Italian military patrol (sport) runners
Italian male cross-country skiers
Olympic biathletes of Italy
Military patrol competitors at the 1936 Winter Olympics
People from Kiens
Alpini
Mountaineering deaths
1913 births
1943 deaths
Olympic gold medalists for Italy
Italian military personnel killed in World War II
Sport deaths in Italy
Sportspeople from Südtirol